Riin is an Estonian feminine given name. Notable people with the name include:
 Riin Emajõe (born 1993), Estonian footballer
 Riin Tamm (born 1981), Estonian geneticist

References

Estonian feminine given names